In mathematics and computer science, the) is a challenge posed by David Hilbert and Wilhelm Ackermann in 1928. The problem asks for an algorithm that considers, as input, a statement and answers "Yes" or "No" according to whether the statement is universally valid, i.e., valid in every structure satisfying the axioms.

Completeness theorem
By the completeness theorem of first-order logic, a statement is universally valid if and only if it can be deduced from the axioms, so the  can also be viewed as asking for an algorithm to decide whether a given statement is provable from the axioms using the rules of logic.

This assumption is now known as the Church–Turing thesis.

History of the problem 
The origin of the  goes back to Gottfried Leibniz, who in the seventeenth century, after having constructed a successful mechanical calculating machine, dreamt of building a machine that could manipulate symbols in order to determine the truth values of mathematical statements. He realized that the first step would have to be a clean formal language, and much of his subsequent work was directed toward that goal. In 1928, David Hilbert and Wilhelm Ackermann posed the question in the form outlined above.

In continuation of his "program", Hilbert posed three questions at an international conference in 1928, the third of which became known as "Hilbert's ". In 1929, Moses Schönfinkel published one paper on special cases of the decision problem, that was prepared by Paul Bernays.

As late as 1930, Hilbert believed that there would be no such thing as an unsolvable problem.

Negative answer 
Before the question could be answered, the notion of "algorithm" had to be formally defined. This was done by Alonzo Church in 1935 with the concept of "effective calculability" based on his λ-calculus, and by Alan Turing the next year with his concept of Turing machines. Turing immediately recognized that these are equivalent models of computation.

Church proved that there is no computable function which decides, for two given λ-calculus expressions, whether they are equivalent or not. He relied heavily on earlier work by Stephen Kleene. If 'algorithm' is understood as meaning a method that can be represented as a Turing machine, and with the answer to the latter question negative (in general), the question about the existence of an algorithm for the  also must be negative (in general). In his 1936 paper, Turing says: "Corresponding to each computing machine 'it' we construct a formula 'Un(it)' and we show that, if there is a general method for determining whether 'Un(it)' is provable, then there is a general method for determining whether 'it' ever prints 0".

The work of both Church and Turing was heavily influenced by Kurt Gödel's earlier work on his incompleteness theorem, especially by the method of assigning numbers (a Gödel numbering) to logical formulas in order to reduce logic to arithmetic.

The  is related to Hilbert's tenth problem, which asks for an algorithm to decide whether Diophantine equations have a solution.  The non-existence of such an algorithm, established by the work of Yuri Matiyasevich, Julia Robinson, Martin Davis, and Hilary Putnam, with the final piece of the proof in 1970, also implies a negative answer to the Entscheidungsproblem.

Some first-order theories are algorithmically decidable; examples of this include Presburger arithmetic, real closed fields, and static type systems of many programming languages. The general first-order theory of the natural numbers expressed in Peano's axioms cannot be decided with an algorithm, however.

Practical decision procedures
Having practical decision procedures for classes of logical formulas is of considerable interest for program verification and circuit verification. Pure Boolean logical formulas are usually decided using SAT-solving techniques based on the DPLL algorithm. Conjunctive formulas over linear real or rational arithmetic can be decided using the simplex algorithm, formulas in linear integer arithmetic (Presburger arithmetic) can be decided using Cooper's algorithm or William Pugh's Omega test. Formulas with negations, conjunctions and disjunctions combine the difficulties of satisfiability testing with that of decision of conjunctions; they are generally decided nowadays using SMT-solving techniques, which combine SAT-solving with decision procedures for conjunctions and propagation techniques. Real polynomial arithmetic, also known as the theory of real closed fields, is decidable; this is the Tarski–Seidenberg theorem, which has been implemented in computers by using the cylindrical algebraic decomposition.

See also 
 Automated theorem proving
 Decidability (logic)
 Hilbert's second problem
 Oracle machine
 Turing's proof

Notes

References 
 David Hilbert and Wilhelm Ackermann (1928). Grundzüge der theoretischen Logik (Principles of Mathematical Logic). Springer-Verlag, .
 Alonzo Church, "An unsolvable problem of elementary number theory", American Journal of Mathematics, 58 (1936), pp 345–363
 Alonzo Church, "A note on the Entscheidungsproblem", Journal of Symbolic Logic, 1 (1936), pp 40–41.
 Martin Davis, 2000, Engines of Logic, W.W. Norton & Company, London,  pbk.
 Alan Turing, "On Computable Numbers, with an Application to the Entscheidungsproblem", Proceedings of the London Mathematical Society, Series 2, 42 (1936–7), pp 230–265. Online versions: from journal website, from Turing Digital Archive, from abelard.org.  Errata appeared in Series 2, 43 (1937), pp 544–546.
 Martin Davis, "The Undecidable, Basic Papers on Undecidable Propositions, Unsolvable Problems And Computable Functions", Raven Press, New York, 1965. Turing's paper is #3 in this volume. Papers include those by Gödel, Church, Rosser, Kleene, and Post.
 Andrew Hodges, Alan Turing: The Enigma, Simon and Schuster, New York, 1983. Alan M. Turing's biography. Cf Chapter "The Spirit of Truth" for a history leading to, and a discussion of, his proof.
 Robert Soare, "Computability and recursion", Bull. Symbolic Logic 2 (1996), no. 3, 284–321. 
 Stephen Toulmin, "Fall of a Genius", a book review of "Alan Turing: The Enigma by Andrew Hodges", in The New York Review of Books, 19 January 1984, p. 3ff.
 Alfred North Whitehead and Bertrand Russell, Principia Mathematica to *56, Cambridge at the University Press, 1962. Re: the problem of paradoxes, the authors discuss the problem of a set not be an object in any of its "determining functions", in particular "Introduction, Chap. 1 p. 24 "...difficulties which arise in formal logic", and Chap. 2.I. "The Vicious-Circle Principle" p. 37ff, and Chap. 2.VIII. "The Contradictions" p. 60 ff.

External links
 

Theory of computation
Computability theory
Gottfried Wilhelm Leibniz
Mathematical logic
Metatheorems
Undecidable problems